Jenny Jump can refer to:

 Jenny Jump, the heroine of some "Wizard of Oz" spin-off books.
 Jenny Jump State Forest in Warren County, New Jersey.
 Jenny Jump Mountain, a mountain in Warren County, New Jersey.